Heartwood is a 1998 American independent drama film written and directed by Lanny Cotler and starring Jason Robards and Hilary Swank.

Plot

Cast
Jason Robards as Logan Reeser
Eddie Mills as Frank Burris
Hilary Swank as Sylvia Orsini
John Terry as Joe Orsini
Randall Batinkoff as Johnny Purfitt
John Dennis Johnston as Carl Burris

References

External links
 

1998 films
American drama films
American independent films
1990s English-language films
1990s American films